Louis Petrie Meston (March 20, 1916 – November 22, 1963) was a provincial politician from Alberta, Canada. He served as a member of the Legislative Assembly of Alberta in 1963 as a member of the governing Social Credit caucus. He also served as a municipal councilor.

Political career
Meston began his political career serving as a municipal councilor and Reeve for the M. D. of Kneehill (now known as Kneehill County).

Meston ran for a seat to the Alberta Legislature in the 1963 Alberta general election. He was nominated to stand as Social Credit candidate in the new electoral district of Three Hills on April 20, 1963. In the election Meston defeated two other candidates by a wide margin to pick up the seat for his party.

Meston died on November 22, 1963 in Drumheller, Alberta. He died before the first sitting of the 15th Alberta Legislative Assembly and never got to take his seat.

References

External links
Legislative Assembly of Alberta Members Listing

1916 births
1963 deaths
Alberta Social Credit Party MLAs
Alberta municipal councillors